Maria Paulina "Pau" Soriano is a Filipino volleyball athlete player of the Creamline Cool Smashers that plays in the Premier Volleyball League (formerly known as the Shakey's V-League).

Personal life
Soriano went to Tandang Sora Elementary School in Banlat, Quezon City and the Ernesto Rondon High School. She is a graduate of Hospitality Management from Adamson University.

Career
During her collegiate years she played with Adamson Lady Falcons from 2008 to 2012 and was team captain from 2011 to 2012 and playing as its quick hitter or middle blocker.

Soriano played with Cagayan Valley Lady Rising Suns from 2013 to 2015. She played the 2013 Shakey's V-League All-Star game.

While having one-year contract with the Philippine Super Liga, she was given a one-year ban and a P$50,000 (approximately US$1,026 in October 2016) fine for playing with the Shakey's V-League club Bureau of Customs Transformers instead of the Standard Insurance-Navy Corvettes from the Philippine Super Liga.

Clubs
  PLDT myDSL Speed Boosters (2013)
  Cagayan Valley Lady Rising Suns (2013-2015)
  Philippine Navy Lady Sailors (2015)
  F2 Logistics Cargo Movers (2016)
  Standard Insurance-Navy Corvettes (2016)
  Bureau of Customs Transformers (2016)
  Creamline Cool Smashers (2017)

Awards

Individual
 UAAP Season 72 "Best Attacker"
 Shakey's V-League 6th Season, 2nd Conference "Best Blocker"
 Shakey's V-League 7th Season, 2nd Conference "Best Blocker" 
 Shakey's V-League 11th Season, 1st Conference "Best Attacker"
 2013 PSL Invitational Conference "Best Scorer"

Club
 2016 Shakey's V-League 13th Season Reinforced Open Conference –  Runner-up, with Bureau of Customs Transformers
 2017 Premier Volleyball League 1st Season Reinforced Open Conference –  Third place, with Creamline Cool Smashers
 2017 Premier Volleyball League 1st Season Open Conference –  Third place, with Creamline Cool Smashers
 2018 Premier Volleyball League Reinforced Conference –  Champion, with Creamline Cool Smashers
 2021 Premier Volleyball League Open Conference –  Runner-up with Creamline Cool Smashers
 2022 Premier Volleyball League Open Conference –  Champion, with Creamline Cool Smashers
 2022 Premier Volleyball League Invitational Conference –  Champion, with Creamline Cool Smashers
 2022 Premier Volleyball League Reinforced Conference -  Third place, with Creamline Cool Smashers

References

Living people
Filipino women's volleyball players
Women's beach volleyball players
1991 births
University Athletic Association of the Philippines volleyball players
Sportspeople from Quezon City
Adamson University alumni
Volleyball players from Metro Manila
Middle blockers
21st-century Filipino women